Martin John Duffield (born 28 February 1964 in Park Royal, England), is an English footballer who played as a midfielder. He played in the Football League for Queens Park Rangers, AFC Bournemouth and Charlton Athletic.

References

External links

Hendon profile at Greensnet
St Albans City profile at Sainstnet

1964 births
Living people
English footballers
People from Park Royal
England youth international footballers
Queens Park Rangers F.C. players
AFC Bournemouth players
Charlton Athletic F.C. players
Enfield F.C. players
Hendon F.C. players
St Albans City F.C. players
Sutton United F.C. players
English Football League players
National League (English football) players
Isthmian League players
Association football midfielders